

Danish Naval Officers surnamed Kaas
Ahasverus Kaas (1693 - 1744) Captain
Bernhard Kaas (1764 - 1795) Senior Lieutenant. son of rear admiral Wolfgang K.(see below)
Christian Ulrich Kaas (1731 - 1803)  Commodore. son of Ahasverus (see above).
Frantz Kaas (1658 - 1690) Junior Lieutenant (no naval forebears or issue)
Frederik Kaas (1730 - 1759) Captain. died in battle with an English warship in East Indies 10 September 1759. Presumably Battle of Pondicherry son of admiral Ulrich K. (see below)
Frederik Christian Kaas (1725–1803) Admiral. son of Hans K. (see below) 
Frederik Christian Kaas (1727–1804) Admiral. son of admiral Ulrik K (see below) 
Georg Conrad Kaas (1762 - 1808) Captain. died November 1808 when his ship ran aground on Kragerø. son of Frederik Christian K. (1725) (i.e. the topmost F C K) .
Hans Kaas (1683 - 1737) Commodore
Hans Michael Kaas (1760 - 1799) Captain. son of Frederik Christian K. (1725) (i.e. the topmost F C K) . See HDMS Hvide Ørn (1798) and HDMS Nidelven
Jørgen Grubbe Kaas (1716 - 1740) Senior Lieutenant. son of Ulrich K.
Malta Kaas (1721 - 1774) Senior Lieutenant. son of Ulrik K., brother to Jørgen Grubbe K.
Ulrich Kaas (1677 - 1746) Admiral. Also :da:Ulrik Kaas
Ulrik Christian Kaas (1729 - 1808) Admiral.  son of Ulrich K.  Captain of HDMS Mars at Algiers in 1770 Also :da:Ulrik Christian Kaas
Wolgang Kaas (1776 - 1840) Commodore. son of Rear Admiral Wolfgang K.

arranged by family
Ahasverus
Christian Ulrich, Ventsel Rotkirk, Wolfgang
Bernhard, Wolfgang
Hans
Frederik Christian (1725)
Georg Conrad, Hans Michael
Ulrich
Frederik, Frederik Christian (1727), Jørgen Grubbe, Malta, Ulrich Christian
Frantz (with no naval forebears)

References

Citation
Gravsted website
Projekt Runeberg - Danish Biographical Lexicon - Vol IX page 71
Salmonsen konversationsleksikon 2 Ed. Vol XIII p 339
T. A. Topsøe-Jensen og Emil Marquard (1935) “Officerer i den dansk-norske Søetat 1660-1814 og den danske Søetat 1814-1932“. Two volumes. Download here.

18th-century Danish military personnel